Kish Galeh Bid (also Romanized as Kīsh Galeh Bīd) is a village in Zalaqi-ye Sharqi Rural District, Besharat District, Aligudarz County, Lorestan Province, Iran. At the 2006 census, its population was 84, in 15 families.

References 

Towns and villages in Aligudarz County